Eulophopalpia is a genus of snout moths. It was described by Inoue in 1982, and is known from Japan. It contains the species E. pauperalis.

The wingspan is about 28 mm.

References

Megarthridiini
Monotypic moth genera
Moths of Japan
Pyralidae genera